Karnataka State Highway 7, commonly referred to as KA SH 7, is a state highway that runs north through Mandya and Hassan districts in the state of Karnataka. This state highway starts at Srirangapatna in Mandya district and ends at Arsikere in Hassan district. The primary destinations are Pandavapura, Krishnarajpet and Channarayapatna.

Route description 
The route followed by this highway is Srirangapatna - Pandavapura - Krishnarajpet - Channarayapatna - Arasikere

References

See also
 List of State Highways in Karnataka

State Highways in Karnataka
Roads in Mandya district
Roads in Hassan district